Haywood Jefferson Powell (born April 25, 1954) is a law professor at  Duke University. Before his return to Duke, he served in the Office of Legal Counsel at the United States Justice Department in Washington, D.C. Before this second tenure in the Justice Department, Powell was the Lyle T. Alverson Professor of Law at The George Washington University in Washington, D.C., a post which he accepted in 2010. Before joining The George Washington University Law Faculty, Powell had been a professor of Law at Duke University since 1987. In 1999 the Duke Bar Association presented Powell with the Excellence in Small Section Teaching Award, and in the academic year 2001–2002, he was Duke University's Scholar/Teacher of the year. More recently, he has been named Frederic Cleaveland Professor of Law and Divinity. Powell is currently a Professor of Law at Duke University, where he teaches constitutional law and leads the school's First Amendment Clinic.

Powell has published several books in the fields of constitutional law and legal history. He has published with presses as diverse as University of Chicago Press, Duke University Press, Carolina Academic Press, and others. He also coauthored a multimedia work, The Contracts Experience a tool for teaching contracts law.

Powell served in both the federal and state governments as a deputy assistant attorney general and as Principal Deputy Solicitor General in the U.S. Department of Justice under President Bill Clinton, and as special counsel to the Attorney General of North Carolina. He has briefed and argued cases in both federal and state courts, including Shaw v. Reno before the Supreme Court of the United States.

A graduate of St. David’s College (now the University of Wales, Lampeter) and of the Yale Law School and Yale Divinity Schools, Professor Powell also has a Ph.D. in Christian theological ethics from Duke University and held a joint appointment in the Divinity School at Duke.

References

Alumni of the University of Wales, Lampeter
Duke University School of Law faculty
Duke University alumni
Living people
1954 births
Yale Law School alumni
Yale Divinity School alumni